Bernadette Mary Allen (born 1956) is a United States foreign service officer and ambassador. She is the former U.S. Ambassador to Niger.

Education and career
Allen was born in Washington, D.C. and raised in Seat Pleasant, Maryland. She earned a B.A. in French Civilization and Linguistics at Central College in Pella, Iowa in 1978. She studied abroad for a year in 1977, earning a Certificate in French Civilization from the Sorbonne in Paris. From 1987–1989 she completed an M.A. in Human Resources Management from George Washington University while handling her regular duties at the Department of State. She speaks French and Mandarin Chinese.

Allen was commissioned into the U.S. diplomatic service in January 1980. On October 26, 2005,  President George W. Bush nominated her to serve as U.S. Ambassador to the Republic of Niger. She was confirmed by the U.S. Senate on February 16, 2006, and sworn in as ambassador on March 28, 2006.

State Department career

Foreign assignments
General Services Officer/Vice Consul at the U.S. Embassy in Bujumbura, Burundi (1980–1982)
Temporary duty assignment as Consul at the U.S. Consulate in Fukuoka, Japan (1984)
Consul at the U.S. Embassy, Manila, Philippines (1982–1984)
Consular Section Chief at the U.S. Consulate General in Guangzhou, China (1991–1994)
Chief of the Montreal Consular Section (2000–2002)
Consul General at the U.S. Consulate General in Montreal (2002–2005)

Domestic assignments
Desk officer in the Africa Bureau’s Regional Affairs Office (1985–1987)
Visa officer in the Visa Office Coordination Division (1985–1989)
Studied Mandarin Chinese at National Foreign Affairs Training Center (NFATC) (1989) and in Taipei, Taiwan (1990)
Deputy Director of Consular Training at the National Foreign Affairs Training Center (NFATC) (1994–1996)
Legislative Management Officer (1996–1998)
Director of the Visa Office Coordination Division (1998–2000)

Awards
Superior Honor Award for leadership as Consul General in Montreal
Meritorious Honor Award for outstanding managerial and professional skills in Guangzhou, China
Superior Honor Award for outstanding leadership and performance as Visa Coordination Division Director

Affiliations and activities
Lifetime membership in the U.S. Tennis Association
Big Sisters of the Washington, DC Metropolitan area volunteer
Usher Board Chairman at the Carmody Hills Baptist Church in Seat Pleasant, Maryland
President of the Central College African-American Student Organization (Pella, Iowa)
Member of service sorority Alpha Delta Epsilon (Pella, Iowa)

References

Sources
United States Department of State: Biography of Bernadette M. Allen
 . Gale Biography In Context. Gale Document Number: GALE|K2021365388 

1956 births
Living people
Ambassadors of the United States to Niger
Central College (Iowa) alumni
People from Washington, D.C.
People from Seat Pleasant, Maryland
George Washington University alumni
African-American diplomats
United States Foreign Service personnel
American women ambassadors